Castanopsis concinna is a species of plant in the family Fagaceae. It is a tree found in broad-leaved evergreen forests of southern Guangdong and Guangxi in China and in Hong Kong. It is under second-class national protection in China. It is threatened by habitat loss.

References

concinna
Flora of Hong Kong
Trees of China
Endemic flora of China
Vulnerable plants
Taxonomy articles created by Polbot